The fifteenth season of South African Idols premiered on 7 July 2019, 17:30 SAST and concluded on 17 November 2019 on the Mzansi Magic TV. The season was won by Luyolo Yiba and the runner-up was Sneziey Msomi.

ProVerb remained as the show's host and an executive producer, while Somizi Mhlongo, Unathi Nkayi and Randall Abrahams also remained as the main judges, with guest judges at each of the four audition cities. The next season was showcasing on 2 August 2020.

Preliminary auditions 

A total of 86 golden tickets were issued at all four stops including pop-up stops this season. Season 15 came with many surprises defying the history of the show, rules changed a bit during theatre week, back up singers were provided, with no backing required from the contestants, each contestant had to out-perform the other, and for the first time, 17 contestants were selected for the next round instead of the traditional 16 to accommodate twins Viggy and Virginia Qwabe.

Finalists

Weekly Song Choice and Result

Top 17 
The judges' job was now over and it was now up to the public to vote for their favourite contestant to advance to the next level of the competition, two methods were introduced to the public, every contestant was allocated a unique voting number. Contestants could be voted either by SMS, the voting number remained the same as other seasons 37400, or voting could be done for free on www.idolssa.tv.

Group A Theme: Songs that Trended (25 August)

Group B Theme: Songs that Trended (1 September)

Top 10: Inspirational Hits (15 September)

Top 9 (22 September)

Top 8 (29 September)

Top 7 (6 October)

Top 6: Showstopper (13 October)

Top 5 (20 October)

Top 4 (27 October)

Top 3 (3 November)

Top 2 (10 November) 

 Before her elimination Micayla performed her single Tragic.

Elimination Chart 
Colour key

References 

Season 15
2019 South African television seasons